Miꞌkmaw hieroglyphic writing or Suckerfish script (Mi'kmawi'sit: Gomgwejui'gasit) was a writing system for the Miꞌkmaw language, later superseded by various Latin scripts which are currently in use. Mi'kmaw are a Canadian First Nation whose homeland, called Mi'kma'ki, overlaps much of the Maritime provinces, specifically all of Nova Scotia, Prince Edward Island, and parts of New Brunswick and Newfoundland and Labrador.

These glyphs, or gomgwejui'gaqan, were derived from a pictograph and petroglyph tradition, and are logograms, with phonetic elements used alongside, including logographic, alphabetic, and ideographic information. The gomgwejui'gasultijig take their name from the gomgwej (plural: gomgwejg) or sucker fish whose tracks are visibly left on the muddy river bottom. Since Mi'kmawi'sit uses several spelling systems, other ways to call Suckerfish script include: komqwejwi'kasikl or gomgwejui'gas'gl.

Classification
Scholars have debated whether the earliest known Miꞌkmaw "hieroglyphs", from the 17th century, qualified fully as a writing system or served as a pictographic mnemonic device. In the 17th century, French Jesuit missionary Chrétien Le Clercq adapted the Miꞌkmaw characters as a logographic system for pedagogical purposes, in order to teach Catholic prayers, liturgy and doctrine to the Mi'kmaq.

In 1978, Ives Goddard and William Fitzhugh of the Department of Anthropology at the Smithsonian Institution, contended that the pre-missionary system was purely mnemonic. They said that it could not have been used to write new compositions.

By contrast, in a 1995 book, David L. Schmidt and Murdena Marshall published some of the prayers, narratives, and liturgies, as represented by hieroglyphs—pictographic symbols, which the French missionaries had used in the last quarter of the seventeenth century, to teach prayers and hymns. Schmidt and Marshall showed that these hieroglyphics served as a fully functional writing system. They said that it was the oldest writing system for a native language in North America north of Mexico.

Michelle Sylliboy cites her Mikm'aw grandmother in asserting that Le Clercq did not invent the script, and it had been in use by the people long before him.

History
Father Le Clercq, a Roman Catholic missionary on the Gaspé Peninsula in New France from 1675, saw Miꞌkmaw children writing hieroglyphics on birchbark. Le Clercq adapted those symbols to write prayers and liturgy, developing new symbols as necessary. Mi'kmak also used porcupine quills pressed directly into the bark in the shape of symbols.

This adapted writing system proved popular among Miꞌkmaq. They were still using it in the 19th century. Since there is no historical or archaeological evidence of these symbols from before the arrival of this missionary, it is unclear how ancient the use of the mnemonic glyphs was. The relationship of these symbols to Miꞌkmaq petroglyphs, which predated European encounter, is unclear.

The Kejimkujik National Park and National Historic Site (KNPNHS), petroglyphs of "life-ways of the Mi'kmaw", include written hieroglyphics, human figures, Mi'kmaq houses and lodges, decorations including crosses, sailing vessels, and animals, etched into slate rocks. These are attributed to the Mi'kmaq, who have continuously inhabited the area since prehistoric times. The petroglyphs date from the late prehistoric period through the nineteenth century. A Mi'kmaq healer, Jerry Lonecloud, transcribed some of these petroglyphs in 1912, and donated his copies to the provincial museum.

Pierre Maillard, Roman Catholic priest, during the winter of 1737–38 created a system of hieroglyphics to transcribe Miꞌkmaq words. He used these symbols to write formulas for the principal prayers and the responses of the faithful, in the catechism, so that his followers might learn them more readily. There is no direct evidence that Maillard was aware of Le Clercq's work in this same field. Maillard left numerous works in the language, which continued in use among the Miꞌkmaq into the 20th century.

Examples

See also
Wiigwaasabak – Ojibwe hieroglyphic birchbarks

References

Bibliography
 Goddard, Ives, and William W. Fitzhugh. 1978. "Barry Fell Reexamined", in The Biblical Archaeologist, Vol. 41, No. 3. (September), pp. 85–88.
 Hewson, John.  1982.  Micmac Hieroglyphs in Newfoundland.  Languages in Newfoundland and Labrador, ed. by Harold Paddock, 2nd ed., 188–199. St John's, Newfoundland: Memorial University.
 Hewson, John.  1988.  Introduction to Micmac Hieroglyphics.  Cape Breton Magazine 47:55-61.  (text of 1982, plus illustrations of embroidery and some photos)
 Kauder, Christian. 1921. Sapeoig Oigatigen tan teli Gômgoetjoigasigel Alasotmaganel, Ginamatineoel ag Getapefiemgeoel; Manuel de Prières, instructions et changs sacrés en Hieroglyphes micmacs; Manual of Prayers, Instructions, Psalms & Hymns in Micmac Ideograms. New edition of Father Kauder's Book published in 1866. Ristigouche, Quebec: The Micmac Messenger.
 Lenhart, John. History relating to Manual of prayers, instructions, psalms and hymns in Micmac Ideograms used by Micmac Indians of Eastern Canada and Newfoundland. Sydney, Nova Scotia: The Nova Scotia Native Communications Society.
 Schmidt, David L., and B. A. Balcom. 1995. "The Règlements of 1739: A Note on Micmac Law and Literacy", in Acadiensis. XXIII, 1 (Autumn 1993) pp 110–127. ISSN 0044-5851
 Schmidt, David L., and Murdena Marshall. 1995. Míkmaq Hieroglyphic Prayers: Readings in North America's First Indigenous Script. Nimbus Publishing.

External links
Míkmaq Portraits Collection Includes tracings and images of Miꞌkmaw petroglyphs
Micmac at ChristusRex.org A large collection of scans of prayers in Miꞌkmaw hieroglyphs.
Écriture sacrée en Nouvelle France: Les hiéroglyphes micmacs et transformation cosmologique (PDF, in French)  A discussion of the origins of Miꞌkmaw hieroglyphs and sociocultural change in the 17th century Miꞌkmaw society.

Hieroglyphs
Logographic writing systems
Mi'kmaq
Native American culture
Obsolete writing systems
Writing systems of the Americas